Bifunctional arginine demethylase and lysyl-hydroxylase JMJD6 is an enzyme that in humans is encoded by the JMJD6 gene.

Function 
This gene encodes a nuclear protein with a JmjC domain. JmjC domain-containing proteins belong to the alpha-ketoglutarate-dependent hydroxylase superfamily. They are predicted to function as protein hydroxylases or histone demethylases. This protein was first identified as a putative phosphatidylserine receptor involved in phagocytosis of apoptotic cells.  Subsequent studies suggest that the protein may cross-react with a monoclonal antibody that recognizes the phosphatidylserine receptor and does not directly function in the clearance of apoptotic cells. Multiple transcript variants encoding different isoforms have been found for this gene. On a physiological level JMJD6 has a role in angiogenesis, the process of vessel formation, whereas  further roles of JMJD6 in pathophysiological processes were implicated, such as mammary tumorigenesis. Here, elevated JMJD6 level were found in breast cancer associated with aggressiveness and metastasis in mice.

References

Further reading 

 
 
 
 
 
 
 
 
 
 
 
 
 
 
 
 
 
 

Human 2OG oxygenases
EC 1.14.11